Karl Augustus Munroe (born 23 September 1979) is an English football defender who last was known to have played for FC United of Manchester. FC United was his eighth club. He has had spells with Macclesfield Town making 119 league appearances, Altrincham, where he played 86 games scoring two goals and Hyde United.

Career

Early career
Munroe started off playing for Oldham Athletic as a schoolboy. He also played for Manchester schoolboys alongside Manchester United player Wes Brown.

Swansea City
In 1994, he joined Swansea City as a schoolboy, in 1997 he broke through into the first team. He left them in 1999 having made only one senior appearance for the club.

Macclesfield Town
In summer 1999, Munroe joined Macclesfield Town where he stayed until 2004. In his five years with them he made a total of 119 league appearances, scoring one goal for the club, playing mostly in the centre of midfield. In summer of 2004, he left the club.

Altrincham
In summer 2005, Munroe joined Conference National newcomers Altrincham. He broke straight into the first team there, where he also played most of his games in central midfield. He stayed at the club until summer 2007, when he left the club having made a total of 86 appearances scoring two goals.

Droylsden
In summer 2007, He joined Conference North club Droylsden where he spent a season, mostly in the starting 11, but missed a few games through injury.

Hyde
In summer 2008, Munroe joined Conference North side Hyde United. He made his debut for the club in a 3–2 defeat to Alfreton Town on 8 August 2008. He spent a season at Hyde, making his last appearance for the club on 25 April 2009, in the 3–1 win over Solihull Moors in the last game of the 2008–09 Conference North season. He made a total of 33 appearances scoring once for the club in all competitions.

FC United of Manchester
In late August 2010, Munroe signed for Northern Premier League Premier Division outfit FC United of Manchester. He signed after appearing as a trialist for the club in pre season.

References

External links

1979 births
Living people
Footballers from Manchester
English footballers
Association football defenders
Swansea City A.F.C. players
Macclesfield Town F.C. players
Northwich Victoria F.C. players
Halifax Town A.F.C. players
Altrincham F.C. players
Droylsden F.C. players
Hyde United F.C. players
F.C. United of Manchester players
English Football League players
National League (English football) players
Northern Premier League players